Wang Huapeng (born 5 August 1999) is a Chinese footballer currently playing as a right-back for Chongqing Liangjiang.

Club career
Wang Huapeng was promoted to the senior team of Guangzhou R&F within the 2020 Chinese Super League season and would make his debut in a league game on 16 August 2020 against Dalian Professional F.C. in a 1-0 victory.

Career statistics

References

External links

1999 births
Living people
Chinese footballers
China youth international footballers
Chinese expatriate footballers
Association football defenders
Chinese Super League players
Zhejiang Professional F.C. players
Real Sociedad footballers
Guangzhou City F.C. players
Chinese expatriate sportspeople in Spain
Expatriate footballers in Spain